This is a list of live action made-for-television films that feature lesbian, gay, bisexual, or transgender characters.   The orientation can be portrayed on-screen, described in the dialogue or mentioned.

(For fictional queer characters  (the "Q" in LGBT-Q), see lists for asexual, intersex, non-binary, and pansexual characters.)



1950s

1970s

1970–1974

1975–1979

1980s

1980–1984

1985–1989

1990s

1990–1994

1995–1999

2000s

2000–2004

2005–2009

2010s

2010–2014

2015–2019

2020s

2020–2024

See also

 List of bisexual characters in television
 List of gay characters in television
 List of lesbian characters in television
 List of transgender characters in television
 List of fictional asexual characters
 List of fictional intersex characters
 List of fictional non-binary characters
 List of fictional pansexual characters
 List of animated series with LGBT characters
 List of comedy television series with LGBT characters
 List of dramatic television series with LGBT characters: 1960s–2000s
 List of dramatic television series with LGBT characters: 2010s
 List of dramatic television series with LGBT characters: 2020s
 List of LGBT characters in soap operas
 List of LGBT characters in radio and podcasts

References

Further reading

Lists of character lists
Lists of entertainment lists
Lists of LGBT fictional characters
Lists of LGBT-related films
Lists of LGBT-related television shows
LGBT Characters